Jacob Daniel McGee (born August 6, 1986) is an American former professional baseball pitcher. McGee was selected by Tampa Bay Devil Rays in the fifth round of the 2004 MLB draft and made his Major League Baseball (MLB) debut in 2008. He played in MLB for the Tampa Bay Rays, Colorado Rockies, Los Angeles Dodgers, San Francisco Giants, Milwaukee Brewers, and Washington Nationals.

Early life
McGee was born in San Jose, California. He grew up in Sparks, Nevada, where he attended Edward C. Reed High School. McGee was selected by the Tampa Bay Devil Rays in the fifth round (135th overall) of the 2004 MLB draft.

Professional career

Tampa Bay Rays

In , McGee spent the year with the Southwest Michigan Devil Rays. McGee was rated by Baseball America as the third-best organizational prospect for Tampa Bay Rays and 15th overall MLB prospect in 2008. In 2007, he was ranked 5th in the Rays' organization and 37th overall in all of baseball.

McGee is nicknamed "Clockhands". He earned the nickname due to his unconventional windup.

McGee had Tommy John surgery on July 8, 2008.

McGee was promoted to the MLB for the first time on September 14, 2010.  He made his MLB debut that night against the New York Yankees, walking three batters and striking out Derek Jeter for his first MLB strikeout. McGee made the Rays MLB roster after spring training in 2011, but he was sent down to the team's Class AAA minor league affiliate after 11 appearances.

In the last few months of the 2014 season, McGee became the Rays' closer. He finished the season with 19 saves. After undergoing elbow surgery to remove "loose bodies" in December 2014, McGee spent the early portion of the 2015 season with the Class AAA Durham Bulls. He underwent knee surgery for a torn meniscus in late August, ending his season.

Colorado Rockies
On January 28, 2016, McGee and Germán Márquez were traded to the Colorado Rockies for Corey Dickerson and Kevin Padlo. McGee had a 4.73 ERA in the 2016 season. McGee and the Rockies avoided salary arbitration on December 3, 2016, by agreeing to a $5.9 million contract for the 2017 season. In 2017, McGee had an  0–2 win–loss record, a 3.61 ERA, and three saves in 62 games.

McGee signed a three-year, $27 million contract with the Rockies after the 2017 season. In 2018, McGee posted a career-worst 6.49 ERA in 61 games. McGee spent time on the disabled list in 2019, posting an ERA of 4.35 in 45 games. McGee was released by the Rockies on July 17, 2020.

Los Angeles Dodgers
On July 21, 2020, McGee signed a one-year contract with the Los Angeles Dodgers. In the pandemic shortened season, he appeared in 24 games with a 3–1 record and 2.66 ERA. McGee allowed one run in  innings over three games in the 2020 NLCS and pitched one scoreless inning in the 2020 World Series as the Dodgers won the championship.

San Francisco Giants
McGee signed a two-year contract with the San Francisco Giants worth $7 million, with a club option for the 2023 season, on February 17, 2021. McGee was named National League Reliever of the Month for July 2021, after not allowing a run in 11 innings and recording seven saves. He finished the 2021 season with 31 saves in 36 chances, as well as a 2.72 ERA and a 0.91 WHIP.

On July 14, 2022, McGee was released by the Giants.

Milwaukee Brewers
On July 22, 2022, McGee signed a one-year contract with the Milwaukee Brewers. On August 7, 2022, McGee was designated for assignment.

Washington Nationals
On August 9, 2022, McGee was claimed off waivers by the Washington Nationals. On September 9, McGee was designated for assignment. He was released on September 11, 2022.

McGee announced his retirement from professional baseball on February 3, 2023.

Personal life
Jake and Morgan McGee have been married since December 2009. As of late 2015, they live in Tampa, Florida. For the last several years, the couple has purchased Christmas presents for foster children in Reno and Tampa.

References

External links

1986 births
Living people
Baseball players from San Jose, California
Charlotte Stone Crabs players
Colorado Rockies players
Gulf Coast Rays players
Hudson Valley Renegades players
Los Angeles Dodgers players
Major League Baseball pitchers
Milwaukee Brewers players
Montgomery Biscuits players
Princeton Devil Rays players
San Francisco Giants players
Southwest Michigan Devil Rays players
Tampa Bay Rays players
Vero Beach Devil Rays players
Washington Nationals players
World Baseball Classic players of the United States
2017 World Baseball Classic players